The Hong Kong women's national field hockey team represents Hong Kong in international women's field hockey competitions.

Tournament record

Asian Games
 1982 – 6th
 1986 – 6th
 2006 – 7th
 2014 – 8th
 2018 – 9th
 2022 – Qualified

Asia Cup
 1985 – 6th
 1989 – 5th
 2007 – 8th
 2009 – 7th
 2013 – 8th

AHF Cup
 1997 – 6th
 2003 – 
 2012 – 
 2016 – 5th

Hockey World League
 2014–15 – Round 1
 2016–17 – 35th

FIH Hockey Series
 2018–19 – First round

See also
 Hong Kong men's national field hockey team

References

Asian women's national field hockey teams
Field hockey
National team